Fagonia is a genus of wild, flowering plants in the caltrop family, Zygophyllaceae, having about 34 species. The latest reorganization of the genus took place in 2021 when systematists Christenhusz & Byng included Fagonia spp.. along with several other Zygophyllum genera, into a new genus named "Zygophyllum L." Species occurring in the US are commonly referred to as fagonbushes. The distribution of the genus includes parts of Africa, the Mediterranean Basin, the Mid-East, India, and parts of the Americas.  Fagonia species have been used ethnobotanically by traditional practitioners under Ayurvedic and other TM healing regimes for many maladies.  Species occur in deserts, dry washes, ditches and on rocky outcrops, including at altitude.

Fagonia laevis is a perennial herb of the United States desert southwest.  It has opposite leaves, trifoliate with spinescent stipules, a lavender corolla and smooth fruits.  Under cultivation, F. indica has been found to have a long taproot and to its growth slowing where temperatures dipped below 65 F.

Commercial Fagonia products available on the web should be viewed with caution by reason of there being little to no authentication as to species contained therein, based on DNA analysis.  It may be that all Fagonia species contain medicinal compounds but that has yet to be established . Research carried out at Quaid-i-Azam U. in Pakistan found that all six Pakistani Fagonia species, both the verified (per B.-A. Beier's 2005 reorganization of the genus) and unverified ones, were represented in commercial Fagonia products in the Islamabad marketplace.  Plant systematists caution that species other than Fagonia, as well as other, unrelated material, can be present in commercial preparations.

Numerous scientific papers cite Fagonia cretica as the species studied.  However, due to the re-ordering of Fagonia species by Beier in 2005, researchers have found that they have actually been studying another Fagonia species, instead, most commonly, Fagonia indica.

In 2022, researchers at the Linus Pauling Institute, Oregon State U., determined that an acid-hydrolyzed extract of F. indica was much more effective than an aqueous extract at causing MCF-7 breast cancer cell death and inhibiting further cell multiplication.

Species
, Plants of the World Online accepts the following species:

Fagonia acerosa Boiss.
Fagonia arabica L.
Fagonia bruguieri DC.
Fagonia californica Benth.
Fagonia charoides Chiov.
Fagonia chilensis Hook. & Arn.
Fagonia cretica L.
Fagonia densa I.M.Johnst.
Fagonia densispina Beier & Thulin
Fagonia glutinosa Delile
Fagonia gypsophila Beier & Thulin
Fagonia hadramautica Beier & Thulin
Fagonia harpago Emb. & Maire
Fagonia indica Burm.f.
Fagonia laevis Standl. (syn. Fagonia californica) – California fagonbush
Fagonia lahovarii Volkens & Schweinf.
Fagonia latifolia Delile
Fagonia latistipulata Beier & Thulin
Fagonia longispina Batt.
Fagonia luntii Baker
Fagonia mahrana Beier
Fagonia minutistipula Engl.
Fagonia mollis Delile
Fagonia olivieri DC.
Fagonia orientalis C.Presl
Fagonia pachyacantha Rydb. – sticky fagonbush
Fagonia palmeri Vasey & Rose
Fagonia paulayana J.Wagner & Vierh.
Fagonia scabra Forssk.
Fagonia scoparia Brandegee
Fagonia spinosissima Blatt. & Hallb.
Fagonia subinermis Boiss.
Fagonia villosa D.M.Porter
Fagonia zilloides Humbert

References

External links

Jepson Manual Treatment
USDA Plants Profile

Mediterranean Species:
Refers to 30 species & medical history/common names - goredsea.com

 
Rosid genera